Stade Mimoun Al Arsi is a multi-use stadium in Al Hoceima, Morocco.  It is currently used mostly for football matches, on club level by Chabab Rif Al Hoceima of the Botola. The stadium has a capacity of 12,000 spectators.

References

Football venues in Morocco
Buildings and structures in Tanger-Tetouan-Al Hoceima